{{Infobox person
| name          = Guy Raymond
| image         = Guy_Raymond_in_The_Undefeated_1969.jpg
| alt           =
| caption       = Raymond in The Undefeated (1969)
| birth_name    = Raymond W. Guyer 
| birth_date    = 
| birth_place   = Niagara Falls, N.Y.
| death_date    = 
| death_place   = Santa Monica, California, U.S.
| occupation    = Actor
| years_active  =
| spouse        = 
}}

Guy Raymond (born Raymond W. Guyer; July 1, 1911 – January 26, 1997) was an American actor.

When he was 15, Raymond debuted professionally as a comedy dancer. Before he became an actor, he danced for 14 years, sometimes performing solo and sometimes as part of a comedy dance team.

Raymond appeared in the films 4D Man, Sail a Crooked Ship, Gypsy, It Happened at the World's Fair, The Russians Are Coming, the Russians Are Coming, The Reluctant Astronaut, The Ballad of Josie, Wild in the Streets, Bandolero! and The Undefeated, among others.

On television, Raymond portrayed Cliff Murdock in Harris Against the World, Karen, and Tom, Dick and Mary. His Murdock character was the only one who appeared in all three of the programs.

In 1966 he guest starred on Gunsmoke playing Dr. Tobias, a seller of herbs and medicines who also purported to be a rainmaker; called to duty while Dodge City was in the midst of its worst drought ever in “The Well” (S12E9).

On Broadway, he had the roles of Ulysses in Hook n' Ladder (1952) and George Herman in Pipe Dream'' (1955). He also acted in stock theater.

Raymond was married to actress Ann Morgan Guilbert. He died on January 26, 1997, in Santa Monica, California at age 85.

Filmography

Films

Television

References

External links
 
 

1911 births
1997 deaths
20th-century American male actors
American male film actors
American male stage actors
American male dancers
People from Niagara Falls, New York